Jeffrey James Berblinger (born November 19, 1970) is an American former Major League Baseball second baseman. Jeff is a 1989 graduate of Goddard High School in Goddard, Kansas. He played one season at the major league level for the St. Louis Cardinals. He was drafted by the Cardinals in the 7th round of the 1993 Major League Baseball Draft.

References

External links

1970 births
Living people
St. Louis Cardinals players
Major League Baseball second basemen
Baseball players from Wichita, Kansas
Nashville Sounds players
Kansas Jayhawks baseball players
St. Petersburg Cardinals players
Glens Falls Redbirds players
Savannah Cardinals players
Arkansas Travelers players
Louisville Redbirds players
Somerset Patriots players
Tacoma Rainiers players
Omaha Golden Spikes players